In Concert is a live album by pianist Kenny Drew with guitarist Philip Catherine and bassist Niels-Henning Ørsted Pedersen recorded in West Germany in 1977 and released by SteepleChase.

Reception
The AllMusic review awarded the album 3 stars stating "This live trio date with the superb bassist Niels Pedersen and guitarist Phillip Catherine is worth looking for."

Track listing
 "Django" (John Lewis) – 15:12 Bonus track on CD 
 "Here's That Rainy Day" (Johnny Burke, Jimmy Van Heusen) – 12:12  
 "Sunset" (Kenny Drew) – 5:31 Bonus track on CD 
 "Twice a Week" (Philip Catherine) – 14:13  
 "Blues in the Closet" (Oscar Pettiford) – 8:21  
 "On Green Dolphin Street" (Bronisław Kaper, Ned Washington) – 9:50

Personnel
Kenny Drew – piano
Philip Catherine – guitar
Niels-Henning Ørsted Pedersen – bass

References

Kenny Drew live albums
1977 live albums
SteepleChase Records live albums